Giovanni Stefano Botticelli (died 1472) was a Roman Catholic prelate who served as Bishop of Cremona (1466–1472).

Biography
On 8 October 1466, Giovanni Stefano Botticelli was appointed Bishop of Cremona by Pope Paul II.
On 18 January 1467, he was consecrated bishop by Giacomo Ammannati-Piccolomini, Bishop of Pavia, with Domenico de Dominicis, Bishop of Brescia, and Lorenzo Roverella, Bishop of Ferrara, serving as co-consecrators. 
He served as Bishop of Cremona until his death in 1472.

References

External links and additional sources

15th-century Italian Roman Catholic bishops
Bishops appointed by Pope Paul II
1472 deaths